The Nebraska State Penitentiary (NSP) is a state correctional facility for the Nebraska Department of Correctional Services. Located in Lincoln, it is the oldest state correctional facility in Nebraska, opening in 1869. Until after World War I, it was the only adult correctional facility in the state.

During 1980-1981, the existing cellblocks constructed during the second half of the 19th century were replaced by four (later five) modular housing units. A new administrative complex and an EPA-approved multi-fuel power plant were also completed at the same time. An existing dormitory building constructed in the 1950s was retained as a medium security facility and two new 100 bed dormitory units were opened in 1998. A thirty-six bed control unit also built in the 1950s continues in use as a high security segregation facility. The Industries Plant, Laundry and other support buildings were retained from the older facility as well.

The inmate population at the NSP typically consists of offenders aged 21 years and above, serving medium to longer sentences. The Nebraska State Penitentiary uses the Unit Management concept designed to improve control and staff/inmate relationships by dividing the larger institution population into smaller, more manageable groups and to improve and personalize the delivery of rehabilitative services.

The NSP has been accredited by the American Correctional Association since 1985. 

The NSP offers a variety of education/rehabilitation programs designed to enhance an inmate's chances for successful community adjustment upon release. These include Educational/Life Skills and Vocational Programs, Self-Improvement (Mental Health and Control Unit Program), (Residential and Non-residential Substance Abuse Treatment), Residential Treatment Community (RTC), Religious Programming and Self-Betterment Activities), and Support Services

The NSP is the site of major components of the Agency's Cornhusker State Industries (CSI) program.

Security Levels: Maximum, Medium and Minimum Custody.
Average Population: 1323
Number of Staff: 465
Cost per Inmate per Year: $27,834

Notable inmates
Vince Champ, convicted sex offender and former comedian.
George Contant, brother of John Sontag, often called collectively The Sontag Brothers, imprisoned for theft; later sent to Folsom State Prison in California for train robbery.
Nikko Jenkins, spree killer; currently sits on death row.
John Joubert, serial killer; executed in 1996.
Carey Dean Moore, executed in 2018.
Harold Lamont Otey, executed in 1994; first person executed in Nebraska since 1959.
Charles Starkweather, Nebraska 1958 spree killer, sentenced to death; executed in the prison's electric chair on June 25, 1959.

External links
Nebraska State Penitentiary official website

Prisons in Nebraska
Buildings and structures in Lincoln, Nebraska
Capital punishment in the United States
Execution sites in the United States
1869 establishments in Nebraska